Etericius is a monotypic genus of flowering plants in the family Rubiaceae. The genus contains only one species, viz. Etericius parasiticus, which is endemic to Guyana.

References

Monotypic Rubiaceae genera